Drive is the debut extended play by New Zealand musician Bic Runga, released in New Zealand in 1995.

Track listing
 "Drive" (Bic Runga) – 3:01
 "You" (Runga, Kelly Horgan) – 4:26
 "Take It Out Sometimes" (Runga) – 3:06
 "Ordinary Girl" (Runga) – 2:41
 "Swim"	(Runga) – 2:56

Chart positions

References

Bic Runga albums
1995 debut EPs
EPs by New Zealand artists
Epic Records EPs